Jake Trew (born 13 September 1999), is an Australian professional soccer player who plays as a forward for Wollongong Wolves.

References

External links

1999 births
Living people
Australian soccer players
Association football forwards
Marconi Stallions FC players
Blacktown City FC players
Wollongong Wolves FC players
Western Sydney Wanderers FC players
National Premier Leagues players